Meshkovo is a rural locality (a selo) in Kozlovsky Selsoviet of Volodarsky District, Astrakhan Oblast, Russia. The population was 118 as of 2010. There are 3 streets.

Geography 
Meshkovo is located 12 km southeast of Volodarsky (the district's administrative centre) by road. Ilyinka is the nearest rural locality.

References 

Rural localities in Volodarsky District, Astrakhan Oblast